Cross County Mall may refer to:

Cross County Mall (Florida), a former mall in West Palm Beach, Florida
Cross County Mall (Illinois), a mall in Mattoon, Illinois
Cross County Shopping Center, a mall in Yonkers, New York